FIVB World Cup may refer to:
 FIVB Volleyball Men's World Cup
 FIVB Volleyball Women's World Cup